A by-election was held for the New South Wales Legislative Assembly electorate of East Sydney on 17 February 1866 because of the resignation of John Caldwell.

Dates

Result

John Caldwell resigned.

See also
Electoral results for the district of East Sydney
List of New South Wales state by-elections

References

1865 elections in Australia
New South Wales state by-elections
1860s in New South Wales